Marcos Sánchez Carmona (1924 – 31 January 2005) was a Chilean basketball player. He competed in the men's tournament at the 1948 Summer Olympics.

References

External links

1924 births
2005 deaths
Chilean men's basketball players
Olympic basketball players of Chile
Basketball players at the 1948 Summer Olympics
Sportspeople from Santiago
Date of birth missing
Place of death missing
1950 FIBA World Championship players